Justin Higgins is an American football coach. He is the head coach for the Keystone Giants football team. Higgins served as the head football coach at Richfield Springs Central High School, in Richfield Springs, New York from 2005 to 2006.

Head coaching record

College

References

External links
 Keystone profile

Year of birth missing (living people)
Living people
Keystone Giants football coaches
Ithaca Bombers football coaches
Kean Cougars football coaches
Lehigh Mountain Hawks football coaches
SUNY Morrisville Mustangs football coaches
Utica Pioneers football coaches
Seton Hill Griffins football coaches
High school football coaches in Pennsylvania